Miguel Mejía Barón (born 17 April 1944) is a Mexican former professional footballer and manager.

He currently works at UNAM as club president

Career
Mejía played for UNAM Pumas and would later manage the club.

He coached Mexico at the 1994 FIFA World Cup.

Honours

Manager
UNAM
CONCACAF Champions' Cup: 1989
Mexican Primera División: 1990–91

Mexico
CONCACAF Gold Cup: 1993

Team coach
1988-1991:  UNAM Pumas
1991-1992:  Monterrey
1993-1995:  Mexico national football team
1996-1998:  Atlante
1999:  Tigres UANL
2000:  Puebla
2001:  UNAM Pumas
()

References

External links

1949 births
Living people
Footballers from Mexico City
Club Universidad Nacional footballers
Mexican football managers
1993 Copa América managers
1994 FIFA World Cup managers
1995 King Fahd Cup managers
1995 Copa América managers
CONCACAF Gold Cup-winning managers
Mexico national football team managers
Club Universidad Nacional managers
C.F. Monterrey managers
Mexican footballers
Association football defenders